Fudbalski klub Rudar Kakanj is a professional association football club from the city of Kakanj that is situated in Bosnia and Herzegovina. FK Rudar was founded on 3 May 1920 in the city of Kakanj.

Currently, the club plays in the First League of the Federation of Bosnia and Herzegovina and plays its home matches on the Stadion Rudara, which can seat 5,000 spectators.

FK Rudar is famous for being the first club for the Bosnian goalkeeper Kenan Hasagić who has played for the Bosnia and Herzegovina national football team.

Honours

Domestic

League
First League of the Federation of Bosnia and Herzegovina:
Runners-up (3): 2005–06, 2006–07, 2008–09

References

External links
FK Rudar Kakanj at Facebook

 
Association football clubs established in 1928
Football clubs in Yugoslavia
Sport in Kakanj
Sport in the Federation of Bosnia and Herzegovina
1928 establishments in Bosnia and Herzegovina
Kakanj
Football clubs in Bosnia and Herzegovina